Glens Fork is an unincorporated community located in Adair County, Kentucky, United States.  Its elevation is 810 feet (247 m).

Glens Fork is located in a region of limestone, so the land is perforated by many sinkholes and small caves.  Most of the area is a karst landscape, where there is no direct drainage into any streams, but instead the rainfall goes directly into sinkholes.  There are several undeveloped caves in the area, including the Helms Caves which contained American Indian artifacts.

History
This community has been variously known as Glens Fork, Glennsville or Glenville (not to be confused with Glenville in McLean County) and Hardscratch and was named for its location on Glens Fork of Russell Creek, which was in turn named after David Glenn, whose hunting party camped in the vicinity while securing supplies for George Rogers Clark's Illinois Campaigns. Glenn and another hunter, William Stewart, had a cabin here used to store meat for the Harrodstown settlers as early as the fall of 1777. David Glenn was one of Harrod's company of Kentucky Pioneers who founded Harrodsburg in 1774.

The first deed at the Adair County courthouse dates from June 29, 1802 with the post office established on September 2, 1857 and discontinued on July 31, 1863 because of the American Civil War.  The post office was re-established on October 10, 1865, and has been in continuous operation since then.  The name "Hardscratch" may refer to a Civil War campsite where living was hard.

On March 25, 1872, the town of Glenville was established by an act of the Kentucky General Assembly. The town boundaries were established as one-quarter of a mile in every direction from the northeast corner of the Masonic Hall, which was established as the center of town. At some point, the town government was discontinued, and Glens Fork became an unincorporated place again.

References

Unincorporated communities in Adair County, Kentucky
Unincorporated communities in Kentucky